Illoulofin Solar Power Station, is a  solar power plant in Benin, whose first 25 MW was commissioned on 19 July 2022, and the next 25 MW is under construction and is expected to come online in 2025.

The solar farm is under development by the Government of Benin, with funding from the European Union (EU), the French Development Agency (AFD) and the Beninese Electricity Company (SBEE). The power station will be built in phases, with the first phase of 25 megawatts capacity followed by the second phase of equal magnitude. The energy from this solar plant will be integrated into the Beninese national electricity grid, during the 25 years of the solar farm's expected lifespan.

Location
The power station is located in the town of Pobè, in Plateau Department, in southeastern Benin, close to the international border with Nigeria.

Overview
The first phase of this power station, comprises 47,212 crystalline PV panels, each rated at 530 Watts, for a generation capacity of 25.02 megawatts.

In December 2021, the Beninese Minister of Energy announced that the design and size of the solar farm had been increased from the original 25MW to a new capacity of 50MW.

Developers
The Beninese government selected the French engineering and construction conglomerate Eiffage to design, construct, operate, maintain the solar farm for the first three years of commercial operation, then transfer it to SBEE. Eiffage in turn, tasked two of its subsidiaries, Eiffage Énergie Systèmes and RMT to carry out the task. During the first three years of commercial operations, Eiffage engineers will train SBEE engineers and technicians on the solar farm operations and maintenance.

Construction timeline, costs and funding
The engineering, procurement and construction (EPC) contractor is a consortium comprising Eiffage Energy Systems and RMT, both of whom are subsidiaries of the Eiffage Group. The first phase of the power station cost US$72 million. It is expected that with the doubling of capacity during the second phase, the cost will increase.

During the first phase, the power station has benefitted from loans provided by the European Union and the French Development Agency. Construction of the first phase started during the second half of 2021 and was expected to conclude in April 2022. Commercial commissioning of the first phase was achieved in July 2022.

See also

List of power stations in Benin

References

Solar power stations in Benin
Plateau Department